Khotso Godfrey Motau (born 7 October 1981) is a South African former professional boxer who competed from 2004 to 2009. As an amateur he represented his country at the 2004 Summer Olympics.

Motau, nicknamed "Masterpiece" was born in Soweto, a township outside of Johannesburg. He qualified for the 2004 Summer Olympics, where he fought as a middleweight. He lost in his only bout to Ukraine's Oleg Maskin. Motau has been compared to South African boxing great Dingaan Thobela.

References

External links
 

1981 births
Living people
Sportspeople from Soweto
Middleweight boxers
Boxers at the 2004 Summer Olympics
Olympic boxers of South Africa
South African male boxers